Gert Johannes Kotze (born ) is a South African rugby union player who last played for the  in the Currie Cup. His regular position is prop.

References

South African rugby union players
Living people
1995 births
People from Upington
Rugby union props
Free State Cheetahs players
Rugby union players from the Northern Cape